The Romance Promoters is a 1920 American silent comedy-drama film directed by Chester Bennett and starring Earle Williams, Helen Ferguson and Charles Wingate.

Cast
 Earle Williams as Captain Todd, D.S.O. / Todfield King
 Helen Ferguson as Betty Lorris
 Charles Wingate as Quentard Lorris
 Tom McGuire as Jason Downer
 Jack Mathis as Simon Slane 
 Ernest Pasque as Count Carlos Vorilla
 J. Parker McConnell as Harry Winthrop
 Mary Huntress as Miss Marks

References

Bibliography
 Rainey, Buck. Sweethearts of the Sage: Biographies and Filmographies of 258 actresses appearing in Western movies. McFarland & Company, 1992.

External links
 

1920 films
1920 comedy-drama films
1920s English-language films
American silent feature films
Silent American comedy-drama films
American black-and-white films
Films directed by Chester Bennett
Vitagraph Studios films
1920s American films
English-language comedy-drama films